John Nicholas Postgate, FBA (born 5 November 1945) is a British academic and Assyriologist. From 1975 to 1981, he was Director of the British School of Archaeology in Iraq. From 1994 to 2013, he was Professor of Assyriology at the University of Cambridge. He is a fellow of Trinity College, Cambridge.

Early life
Postgate was born on 5 November 1945. He is a member of the Postgate family. He was educated at Winchester College, a boys public school in Winchester, Hampshire, between 1959 and 1963. He was a Collegeman, meaning he was a recipient of a scholarship. He studied at Trinity College, Cambridge, and graduated from the University of Cambridge with a Bachelor of Arts (BA) degree.

Academic career
Postgate began his academic career as an assistant lecturer in Akkadian at the SOAS, University of London from 1967 to 1971. He then returned to the University of Cambridge, his alma mater, as a fellow of Trinity College from 1970 to 1974. From 1972 to 1975, he was also deputy-director of the British School of Archaeology in Iraq. He was promoted in 1975, and served in the full-time role of Director from 1975 to 1981.

In 1982, he returned to the University of Cambridge and once more became a fellow of Trinity College, Cambridge. From 1982 to 1985, he was a university lecturer in the history and archaeology of the Ancient Near East. He was promoted to Reader in Mesopotamian studies in 1985. He was promoted to Professor of Assyriology in 1994.

He undertook excavations at Abu Salabikh, a Sumerian city in Iraq, from 1975 to 1989. Postgate and Bahija Khalil, director of the Iraq Museum, published "Texts in the Iraq Museum: Texts from Niniveh" in 1994. From 1994 to 2013, he was the director of excavations at Kilise Tepe, a Bronze and Iron Age site in Turkey.

Postgate retired from full-time academia in 2013.

Honours
Postgate was elected Fellow of the British Academy (FBA) in 1993.

References

Living people
English Assyriologists
Fellows of Trinity College, Cambridge
Academics of the University of Cambridge
1945 births
Fellows of the British Academy
People educated at Winchester College
Nicholas
Assyriologists